Cycloceras is an extinct nautiloid cephalopod genus from the Carboniferous of Western Europe, (Ireland and Scotland) of unknown affinity with the Orthocerida.

Taxonomy
Cycloceras was named by McCoy (1844 and assigned to the Michelinoceratida by Flower (1962)and to the Orthocerida by Sweet in Teichert et al. (1964); Cycloceras is possibly a member of the Cycloceratidae and may be synonymous with Perigrammoceras.

Morphology
The type species of Cycloceras, C. annularis,  is based in an internal mold of a body chamber on which the position of the siphuncle is indiscernible (Sweet 1964,)  Species referred to Cycloceras are annulated, subcylindrical orthocones with no longitudinal ornamentation . Fig 186, p K258 Teichert et al. (1964) shows Cycloceras as narrow, gently expanding, annulated othocone with a narrow subcentral siphuncle. Annuli (circular transverse bands or costae) are thick and close spaced, giving a corrugated appearance.

References

Prehistoric nautiloid genera
Carboniferous cephalopods
Prehistoric animals of Europe
Paleozoic life of Ontario
Paleozoic life of Nunavut
Orthocerida
Fossil taxa described in 1844
Taxa named by Frederick McCoy